Rakovka is a rural locality (a settlement) in Novokharkovskoye Rural Settlement, Olkhovatsky District, Voronezh Oblast, Russia. The population was 79 as of 2010.

Geography 
Rakovka is located 17 km north of Olkhovatka (the district's administrative centre) by road. Novokulishovka is the nearest rural locality.

References 

Rural localities in Olkhovatsky District